Waylon is a given name.

People with the name

Waylon (singer) (born Willem Bijkerk in 1980), Dutch singer
Waylon Brown (born 1979), American politician from Iowa
Waylon Francis (born 1990), Costa Rican footballer 
Waylon Jennings (1937–2002), American country singer, songwriter and musician
Waylon Jennings Jr. (born 1979),  American singer-songwriter, son of the above
Waylon Lowe (born 1980), American mixed martial artist
Waylon Muller, Marshall Islands wrestler
Waylon Murray (born 1986), South African rugby union player
Waylon Payne (born 1972), American country singer, songwriter, musician and actor
Waylon Prather (born 1985), American football coach and former punter
Waylon Reavis (born 1978), American singer
Waylon Woolcock (born 1982), South African mountain biker

Fictional characters
Waylon Smithers, a character from The Simpsons
Waylon Jeepers, a villain from Freakazoid!
Waylon Park, the protagonist in the DLC of Outlast, Outlast: Whistleblower
Killer Croc (Waylon Jones), a supervillain from DC Comics